Cool Bricks is a 1999 block breaker game developed by Pukka Games and published by SCi Games. The game is an adaptation of the arcade game Breakout for the Game Boy Color.

Gameplay

 

Cool Bricks is a puzzle game requires the player to use a bat to guide a ball to break bricks to progress. Compared to Breakout, Cool Bricks features the inclusion of varied weapons, such as laser guns, missiles, grenade launchers, larger bats or multiple balls, and the addition of power-ups with positive and negative effects, such as a 'poison mode' that creates involuntary player movement. The game features over 150 levels with a password system to allow for returning to certain stages. The graphics of Cool Bricks are programmed to make use of a 'high-color mode' in the Game Boy Color that allows the device to display 2,000 instead of 50 colors on screen, by compromising with reduced animations.

Reception

Cool Bricks received positive reviews from gaming publications. Many reviewers made favorable comparisons made to the  arcade games Breakout and Arkanoid, whilst praising the minor additions to the game such as the use of power-ups. David O'Donohoe for Console Domain praised the game as a "perfect port" of the Breakout formula, stating that "with a few new graphics and fresh levels in order to sell it to a new, younger audience [...] the gameplay is as addictive now as it has always been". 64 Magazine praised Cool Bricks as "extremely well suited to the Game Boy Color" and "almost impossible to put down once you've started playing". Total Game Boy Color also praised the game, noting whilst it was not "ground-breakingly original", Cool Bricks was an "addictive, challenging puzzler".

References

External links

1999 video games
Game Boy Color games
Game Boy Color-only games
Paddle-and-ball video games
Pukka Games games
Single-player video games